Petar Remete (13 August 1937 – 22 October 2011) was a Croatian footballer.

Career
Born in Ilok, Danube Banovina, Kingdom of Yugoslavia, he begin his career in 1954 playing with Sloga Vukovar, a traditional club from that town neighbouring to his birthplace, and predecessor of nowadays HNK Vukovar '91. After only one season, he moved to Bačka Bačka Palanka where he stayed 6 seasons. His great performances as forward earned him 3 appearances in the Yugoslav U-21 team, and, after crowning himself top-scorer of the Yugoslav Second League in 1960, he called the attention of the big clubs, ending up by signing with Dinamo Zagreb in 1961. During his time at Dinamo, he played mostly as either left or right winger, and he scored a total of 27 goals in 46 appearances, of which 17 appearances and 4 goals were in the Yugoslav First League. He then went on and played with Trešnjevka, Karlovac, Kladivar and Lokomotiva, one season with each of the clubs, before returning to Bačka Bačka Palanka in 1966 and played there until he finished his career in 1973.

He died on 22 October 2011.

Honours
 Yugoslav Second League top-scorer: 1960

References

1937 births
2011 deaths
People from Ilok
Association football forwards
Association football wingers
Yugoslav footballers
Yugoslavia under-21 international footballers
OFK Bačka players
GNK Dinamo Zagreb players
NK Trešnjevka players
NK Karlovac players
NK Celje players
NK Lokomotiva Zagreb players
Yugoslav First League players